Sir Edwyn Wren Hoskyns (4 February 1956 – 19 February 2015) was a British paediatrician and researcher into childhood diseases, notably tuberculosis, and from 2 June 2010 the 17th Hoskyns Baronet of Harewood in the County of Hereford in the Baronetage of England.  He died on 19 February 2015.

The 17th Bt carries and uses the name Wren that derives from the name of the son of the 7th Bt. who married Theodosia, the great-granddaughter of the famous English architect and polymath, Sir Christopher Wren. Theodosia was her father's only child, and married Chandos Wren-Hoskyns on 20 April 1837 after Chandos Hoskyns had his name changed in the previous week by Royal Licence. They had one daughter, who died without issue. Her Wren inheritance passed to her cousins in the Hoskyns family. The Hoskyns family continued to use Wren and Chandos in other branches in subsequent generations to keep the names alive.

Family
Hoskyns was the son of physician Sir Benedict Leigh Hoskyns, 16th Baronet from 1956–2010, and Ann Wilkinson.

He married Winifred Jane Sellers, daughter of John Sellers, early in 1981. They had two children:
 A son, Robin Chevallier Hoskyns, b. 5 July 1989.
 Lucy Mary Hoskyns, b. 1993

Education and work
He attended King's College School, Cambridge, as a chorister, and then Harwich County High School. He subsequently attended the University of Nottingham there graduating with Bachelor of Science and Master of Science degrees before graduating as a medical doctor (1980) specialising in paediatrics (1993). He was a Member (MRCP) and Fellow (FRCP) of the Royal College of Physicians. His paediatric research included considerable work with Tuberculosis (Phthisiatry). As of 2011, he was practising at Leicester General Hospital and Leicester Royal Infirmary.

Publications
Hoskyns' publications include:
 Tuberculous meningitis in children: problem to be addressed effectively with thorough contact tracing, Rajneesh Walia and Wren Hoskyns, European Journal of Pediatrics, Volume 159, Number 7, 535-538 (2000)
 Paediatric tuberculosis, postgraduate Medical Journal, 2003;79:272-278
 Treatment failure in Tuberculosis, ERJ Express. 29 November 2006

He is regularly cited and acknowledged by other published researchers in the field of childhood diseases, notably tuberculosis.

References

1956 births
2015 deaths
20th-century English medical doctors
Tuberculosis researchers
Choristers of the Choir of King's College, Cambridge
Baronets in the Baronetage of England
21st-century English medical doctors
British pulmonologists